Eduard Pendorf (18 October 1892 – 3 November 1958) was a German international footballer who played for VfB Leipzig.

References

External links
 

1892 births
1958 deaths
Sportspeople from Bremerhaven
Association football midfielders
German footballers
Germany international footballers
1. FC Lokomotive Leipzig players
Footballers from Bremen (state)